I Carinae is a single, yellow-white hued star in the southern constellation Carina. It is a fourth magnitude star that is visible to the naked eye. An annual parallax shift of 61.64 mas provides a distance estimate of 62 light years. It is moving closer with a radial velocity of −5 km/s, and in an estimated 2.7 million years will pass within  of the Sun. In the next 7500 years, the south Celestial pole will pass close to this star and Omega Carinae (5800 CE).

Gray et al. (2006) gave this star a stellar classification of F3 V, indicating it is an F-type main-sequence star that is generating energy through hydrogen fusion at its core. It is younger than the Sun with an estimated age of 977 million years, and is spinning with a projected rotational velocity of 51.6 km/s. The star has 1.4 times the mass of the Sun and is radiating 5.56 times the Sun's luminosity from its photosphere at an effective temperature of around 7,017 K. It is a variable star and most likely (99.2% chance) the source of detected X-ray emission coming from these coordinates.

References

F-type main-sequence stars
Carinae, I
Carina (constellation)
Durchmusterung objects
0391
090589
050954
4102